This article displays the rosters for the teams competing at the 2019 Ready Steady Tokyo men's field hockey test event. Each team had to submit 18 players.

Teams

India
The following 16 players were named in the India squad, which was announced on 25 July.

Head Coach:  Graham Reid

Japan
The following 16 players were named in the Japan squad, which was announced on 10 August.

Head Coach:  Siegfried Aikman

Malaysia
The following 18 players were named in the Malaysia squad.

Head Coach:  Roelant Oltmans

New Zealand
The following 16 players were named in the New Zealand squad, which was announced on 5 August.

Head Coach:  Darren Smith

References

Sports competitions in Tokyo
August 2019 sports events in Japan